Beverley Nielsen (born 25 January 1960), is an entrepreneur, educator and campaigner who works as executive director, Institute for Design, Economic Acceleration & Sustainability (IDEAS) at Birmingham City University. She has previously worked as a director for AGA Rangemaster, and as managing director for Fired Earth. In 2016 Nielsen was selected as the Liberal Democrat Candidate for the Mayor of the West Midlands, standing as the first and only female candidate, but was defeated in the 2017 mayoral election by Conservative candidate Andy Street, coming third after Labour and ahead of UKIP.

Early life 
Nielsen was born in Malvern Worcestershire where her mother, Ethel Mary Nielsen, was, for a period, a teacher at Malvern Girls’ College and her father, Dr Stanley Nielsen, was a research chemist at the Royal Radar Establishment (now known as Qinetiq). Following this he and his young family relocated to Ireland where he worked for the National Board of Science and Technology, the organisation with central responsibility for national science and technology (later reformed as part of Eolas).

Nielsen attended the Grove Primary School, Malvern, and following the family's move to Ireland she was educated at Glengara Park School, Glenageary and St Columba's College, Rathfarnham, Dublin, before attending Trinity College Dublin where she completed an honours degree in Law, following which she gained a Master's degree in Business Studies from University College Dublin, completing her dissertation on the International Marketing of Irish Designer Fashion.

Business career 
After graduating, Nielsen worked for the Confederation of British Industry, London, and researched the impact of non-tariff barriers across the European Community on British Business, producing a report for the House of Lords Select Committee on the European Communities, in 1982. Following this Beverley was promoted to the position of Acting Manager, CBI Brussels.

She later worked in fashion at New York Vogue, in Dublin as an equity dealer for Dermot Desmond, creator of the International Financial Services Centre, before returning to the CBI in 1992 and working as Assistant Director, CBI North West, contributing to the successful lobbying for Runway 2 at Manchester Airport and promoting best practice sharing amongst SMEs as a board director of Excellence North West.

In 1995 she was appointed to the position of Director, CBI West Midlands, where Nielsen represented West Midlands industry, collaborating with CBI members and Regional Chairmen, including Lord Jones of Birmingham, Chairman, CBI West Midlands 1998–2000, whilst lobbying to promote the wider value of West Midlands’ manufacturing. Beverley continued to lobby for business becoming CEO, for the Midlands tourism lobby, the Heart of England Tourist Board during the Foot & Mouth disease crisis. In early 2003 she moved to work in manufacturing and retail as a director for AGA Rangemaster, and later as managing director of subsidiary business, Fired Earth.

Since 2012 and the Birmingham Made Me campaign, led by Birmingham City University, Nielsen has assisted students and entrepreneurs start up 45 new businesses and chairs two which she founded – Boundless Outdoors and Ultra Light Rail Partners.  She led UK first-of-a-kind trials powering a light train using of biomethane and kinetic energy storage following a grant from the Department for Transport/SBRI Innovate UK and won a further grant from the government’s Sustainable Innovation Fund to design a lightweight biomethane and battery powered train, the BioUltra, capable of carrying 120 people.

Political career
Nielsen became a Liberal Democrat councillor on Malvern Hills District Council in 2019, where she was the portfolio holder for Economic Development and Tourism. She was the Liberal Democrat candidate for West Worcestershire in the 2019 general election, finishing second with 10,410 votes (18.1%). She was selected in 2016 and 2020 as the Liberal Democrat candidate for the Mayor of West Midlands, but resigned from the party along with four other councillors in August 2020 over a split on the Malvern Hills District Council. She stood and was elected to Worcestershire County Council as an Independent Councillor for Malvern Langland in May 2021 where she sits as part of the Green and Independent Alliance Group (GAIA Group). In 2020 she was appointed Climate Tsar for Liam Byrne MP's West Midlands Mayoral campaign in 2021.

Publications 
Through her work at Birmingham City University’s think tank, IDEAS, Beverley has co-edited two books including English Regions After Brexit with Dr Steve McCabe and Brexit Negotiations After Article 50 with Professor Alex de Ruyter. She has also co-written Redesigning Manufacturing with economist, Vicky Pryce and Professor Michael Beverland. She is currently co-editing books on the Green Economy and Green Manufacturing with Dr Steve McCabe, to be published by Bite-Sized Books.

Campaigns 
In December 2020 Warwickshire College Group announced their intention to close Malvern Hills College. A Save our Students task force was formed by Cllr Tom Wells and chaired by Nielsen, raising over £850,000, linking together with campaigning by students promoting Save Malvern Hills College website, a Change.org petition and a Postcard Protest.

Personal life 
Nielsen married Robert Emmerson in 1992 and they have three children, Niels, Charles, and Amelia.

References 

1960 births
Living people
Academics of Birmingham City University
Alumni of Trinity College Dublin
Alumni of University College Dublin
English women educators
British businesspeople
Liberal Democrats (UK) councillors
Councillors in Worcestershire
People from Glenageary
Women councillors in England